RJ Ronquillo (born 1976 in Detroit, MI) is a Filipino-American session/touring guitarist and YouTube personality. He has performed and recorded with artists such as Ricky Martin, Santana, Tupac Shakur, Stone Sour, Stevie Wonder, and Thompson Square. He is known for his YouTube channel which focuses on guitar gear demos, guitar lessons, and behind-the-scenes tour vlogs.

Early life and education 
Ronquillo was born in Detroit, Michigan and grew up in Grosse Pointe, an eastern suburb. He attended the Grosse Pointe Academy from preschool through eighth grade, and Grosse Pointe South High School. He attended the Frost School of Music at the University of Miami in Coral Gables, Florida and graduated with a bachelor of music degree in Studio Music & Jazz for guitar.

Touring & recording career 
In 2001, while living in South Florida , Ronquillo began touring and recording with Jamaican reggae band, Inner Circle.  In 2002 he recorded rhythm guitars for the song,  "Why Don't You & I", on the Santana album Shaman. In 2006, he played on Ricky Martin's MTV Unplugged album and DVD, after which he joined the touring band for Martin's 2007 Black and White Tour. In January 2009, Ronquillo joined the LA based hard rock band, The Chelsea Smiles, and recorded on their 2009 self-titled album. In 2010, he toured with Latin pop singer, Chayanne, for his No Hay Imposibles world tour.

YouTube 
Ronquillo began his YouTube career in 2011, with a series of guitar demos for the Canadian guitar brand, Eastwood Guitars.

Discography 

 Shaman - Santana (2002)
 Better Dayz - 2Pac (2002)
 After The Storm - Monica (2003)
 Grand Champ - DMX (2003)
 MTV Unplugged - Ricky Martin (2006)
 Ricky Martin Live: Black and White Tour - Ricky Martin (2007)
 The Chelsea Smiles - The Chelsea Smiles (2009)
 Studio Live Session - Judith Hill (2019)
 Re-Imaginos - Albert Bouchard (2020)
 Imaginos II:Bombs Over Germany (minus zero and counting) -  Albert Bouchard (2021)

References 

1976 births
Living people
People from Detroit
People from Michigan
Guitarists from Detroit
Guitarists from Michigan